Jal Jal Mare Patang is a 2009 Gujarati language biographical play that was written by Mihir Bhuta and directed by Manoj Shah. The play depicts the life of 19th-century Indian writer and philosopher Manilal Dwivedi (1858–1898).

Background
Jal Jal Mare Patang, which was written by Mihir Bhuta and directed by Manoj Shah, is based on Manilal's autobiography Atmavrittanta (1979). It took Shah seven years to complete research for the play. It was first premiered at National Centre for the Performing Arts (NCPA) on 28 February 2009.

The play's songs have been sung by Kaumudi Munshi, Purushottam Upadhyay, Ashit Desai, Uday Mazumdar, Suresh Joshi, Parthiv Gohil, and Karsan Sagathiya. The play featured paintings by Atul Dodiya as a backdrop. The play received A-certificate from the Maharashtra Censor Board of Theatres.

Summary
The play presents aspects of Dwivedi's character as a scholar, writer, and supporter of women's education; and his illness. It focuses on lust, literature and spirituality, which according to Shah were  major elements of Dwivedi's life.

Cast
The original cast included:

 Vedish Jhaveri as Manilal Dwivedi
 Shailendra Patel as Manilal's father
 Kalpana Shah as Manilal's mother
 Trupti Thakkar as Manilal's wife Fuli
 Vimal Upadhyay as Balashankar Kantharia
 Bhagvati Saghathia as Balashankar Kantharia's wife
 Ashok Parmar as Manilal's pupil Chhotu
 Vaishakhi Shukla as Chhotu's wife Ram
 Aishwarya Mehta as Diwaliben
 Chetan Dhanani as Kavi Kant
 Janam Shah as Kalapi
 Jay Upadhyay as Manilal's Parsi friend

Reception
Utpal Bhayani praised Bhuta and Shah for Jal Jal Mare Patang authentic adaptation of Dwivedi's life. He also praised performances, especially that of Vedish Jhaveri, as well the as music, songs, costumes, sets, and lighting but criticised the non-linear structure of the play and called it "confusing". He also praised the creativity in scenes such as Manilal's insistence of eschewing the use of western toilets by his parents, his relationships with his wife, his student's wife, and Manigaurin, as well as his ragging at Elphinstone College while criticising Manilal's meetings with Kalapi and Kant. Deepa Punjani of the Mumbai Theatre Guide compared Jal Jal Mare Patang with Shah's previous biographical plays. She criticised its glorification of Manilal, and the predictability and lack of depth and "layers" in the play. Punjani also called Jhaveri's performance "loud and over the top".

References

Manilal Dwivedi
2009 plays
Biographical plays about writers
Biographical plays about philosophers
Gujarati-language plays
Plays set in the 19th century
Plays set in India
Cultural depictions of Indian men
Cultural depictions of poets